The V-3 (("Vengeance Weapon 3") was a German World War II large-caliber gun working on the multi-charge principle whereby secondary propellant charges are fired to add velocity to a projectile.

The Germans planned to use the weapon to bombard London from two large bunkers in the Pas-de-Calais region of northern France, but they were rendered unusable by Allied bombing raids before completion. Two similar guns were used to bombard Luxembourg from December 1944 to February 1945.

The V-3 was also known as the Hochdruckpumpe ("High Pressure Pump," HDP for short), which was a code name intended to hide the real purpose of the project. It was also known as Fleißiges Lieschen ("Busy Lizzie").

Description
The gun used multiple propellant stages placed along the barrel's length in order to provide an additional boost. These were ignited by the hot gases that propelled the projectile as it passed them. Solid-fuel rocket boosters were used instead of explosive charges because of their greater suitability and ease of use. These were arranged in symmetrical pairs along the length of the barrel, angled to project their thrust against the base of the projectile as it passed. This layout spawned the  German codename Tausendfüßler ("millipede"). 

The barrel and side chambers were designed as identical sections to simplify production and allow damaged sections to be replaced. The entire gun would use multiple such sections bolted together. The smoothbore gun fired a fin-stabilized shell that depended upon aerodynamic forces rather than gyroscopic forces to prevent tumbling (as distinct from conventional rifled weapons which cause the projectile to spin).

Background
The basic idea of the multi-charge concept is that in a traditional single-charge gun the pressure in the barrel is at its peak when the charge is fired, and then continually dwindles to some much lower value as the shell travels down the barrel and the combustion gasses expand. This requires a traditional gun to be much heavier at the breech end in order to successfully contain this pressure, and as the gun grows in power, the weight becomes untenable. The multi-charge concept uses a low-power initial charge and continues adding more charges as the shell moves along the barrel, resulting in a much more constant pressure as the shell moves. This reduces peak pressure and the need to have a heavy breech, as well as providing smoother acceleration.

The origin of the multi-chamber gun dates back to the 19th century. In 1857, U.S. inventor Azel Storrs Lyman (1815–1885) was granted a patent on "Improvement in accelerating fire-arms", and he built a prototype in 1860 which proved to be unsuccessful. Lyman then modified the design in collaboration with James Richard Haskell, who had been working for years on the same principle.

Haskell and Lyman reasoned that subsidiary propellant charges could increase the muzzle velocity of a projectile if the charges were spaced at intervals along the barrel of a gun in side chambers and ignited an instant after a shell had passed them. The "Lyman-Haskell multi-charge gun" was constructed on the instructions of the U.S. Army's Chief of Ordnance, but it did not resemble a conventional artillery piece. The barrel was so long that it had to be placed on an inclined ramp, and it had pairs of chambers angled back at 45 degrees discharging into it. 

It was test fired at the Frankford Arsenal at Philadelphia in 1880 and was unsuccessful. The flash from the original propellant charge bypassed the projectile due to faulty obturation and prematurely ignited the subsidiary charges before the shell passed them, slowing the shell down. New prototypes of multi-charge guns were built and tested, but Lyman and Haskell abandoned the idea.

During the same period, French engineer Louis-Guillaume Perreaux, one of the pioneers of the motorcycle, had been working on a similar project since before 1860. Perreaux was granted a patent in 1864 for a multi-chamber gun. In 1878, Perreaux presented his invention at the World Exhibition of Paris.

Development
In 1918, the French Army made plans for a very long range multi-chamber gun in response to the German Paris Gun. The French initiative did not reach the prototype stage, as it was discontinued when the retreat of the German armies and the armistice put an end to the bombardment. The plans for the multi-chamber gun were archived, as they had been envisioned to counter the German fire.

France collapsed in June 1940 at the beginning of World War II, and German troops acquired the plans of this long-range gun. In 1942, this patent attracted the attention of August Cönders, developer of the Röchling shell and chief engineer of the plants "Röchling Stahlwerk AG" in Wetzlar, Germany. Cönders thought that the gradual acceleration of the shell by a series of small charges spread over the length of the barrel might be the solution to the problem of designing very long range guns. The very strong explosive charge needed to project shells at a high speed was causing very rapid degradation of the gun tubes of conventional guns.

Cönders proposed the use of electrically activated charges to eliminate the problem of the premature ignition of the subsidiary charges, the problem experienced by the Lyman-Haskell gun. Cönders built a prototype of a 20 mm multi-chamber gun using machinery readily available at the Wetzlar plant, machinery that was producing tubes of this calibre for the Flak 38 anti-aircraft guns of 20 mm. The first tests were encouraging, but to get the support of the Ministry of arms, Hermann Röchling had to present to Albert Speer Cönders' project of a cannon capable of firing on London from the coast of the Pas-de-Calais.

Speer told Adolf Hitler about the proposal in May 1943. After the Royal Air Force (RAF) bombed the Peenemünde rocket center on 17 August, Hitler agreed to Speer's suggestion that the gun be built without more tests. Cönders constructed a full-calibre gun at the Hillersleben proving ground near Magdeburg but, by the end of 1943, he had encountered severe problems both in putting the gun's basic principle into operation and in producing a feasible design for the shells that it was to fire. Nonetheless, a proposal was made to build a single full-sized gun with a  barrel at Misdroy on the Baltic island of Wolin, near Peenemünde, while construction went ahead at the Mimoyecques site in France (which had already been attacked by the USAAF and the RAF). The Heereswaffenamt (Weapon Procurement Office) took control of the project by March 1944, and, with no good news from Misdroy, Cönders became one of the engineers working on the three chief problems: projectile design, obturation, and ignition of the secondary charges.

Six different companies produced satisfactory designs for projectiles, including Krupp and Škoda Works.  Obturation problems were solved by placing a sealing piston between the projectile and the initial propellant charge, which in turn prevented the flash from the charge from getting ahead of the projectile and solved the problem of controlling the initiation of the secondary charges. By the end of May 1944, there were four designs for the 150 mm finned projectile, one manufactured by Fasterstoff (designed by Füstenberg) and three others by Röchling (Cönders), Bochumer (Verein-Haack), and Witkowitz Ironworks (Athem).

Trials were held at Misdroy from 20–24 May 1944 with ranges of up to  being attained. The gun burst during the testing, putting an end to the tests.

Mimoyecques site

Major Bock of Festung Pioneer-Stab 27 (the fortification regiment of LVII Corps, Fifteenth Army, at the time based in the Dieppe area) was given the task of finding a suitable site for the HDP batteries following Hitler's decision that HDP guns should be sited in northern France to bombard London. A study in early 1943 concluded that a hill with a rock core would be most suitable, as the gun tubes could be placed in drifts (inclined tunnels) and support equipment and supplies located in adjacent tunnels. The guns would not be movable and would be permanently aimed at London.

It was code-named Wiese (meadow) and Bauvorhaben 711 (Construction Project 711), and Organisation Todt began construction in September 1943 with the building of railway lines to support the work, and began to excavate the gun shafts in October. Both facilities were served by an underground railway tunnel and underground ammunition storage galleries.

Large steel plates protected the five openings and each drift had a special armoured door. Extensive tunnels and elevator shafts supported the guns and, if the site had become operational, about 1,000 troops from Artillerie Abteilung 705 and supporting units would have been deployed at Mimoyecques. Artillerie Abteilung 705 had been organised in January 1944 under Oberstleutnant Georg Borttscheller to operate the Wiese gun complex.

The plans were to have the first battery of five gun tubes ready for March 1944, and the full complex of 25 gun tubes by 1 October 1944. A failure occurred at the Misdroy proving ground in April 1944 after only 25 rounds had been fired and, as a result, the project was further cut back from five drifts to three, even though work had begun on some of the other drifts. 

The site was finally put out of commission on 6 July 1944, when bombers of RAF Bomber Command's 617 Squadron (the famous "Dambusters") attacked using  "Tallboy" deep-penetration bombs.

Luxembourg bombardment
The project eventually came under the control of the SS, and SS General Hans Kammler ordered it to be ready for action in late 1944, assisted by Walter Dornberger.

The two guns were aimed west, resting on 13 steel support structures on solid wooden bases on a 34 degree slope. Concrete blockhouses were constructed between the two gun tubes, as well as ten smaller bunkers to hold projectiles and propellant charges.

The assembly and mounting of the Lampaden guns coincided with the final preparations for the Battle of the Bulge. The supply of ammunition became problematic due to the state of the German railway network. Time had become critical, and it was decided to use a  finned projectile with a discarding sabot, weighing  and carrying a  explosive charge.

By the time that the Ardennes offensive began on 16 December 1944, Kammler received orders from OB West (German Army Command in the West) to begin firing at the end of the month, and the first gun tube was ready for action on 30 December 1944. Two warm-up rounds were initially fired, followed by five high-explosive shells which were fired in sequence, attended by Kammler.

The second gun tube was brought into operation on 11 January 1945 and 183 rounds in total were fired until 22 February 1945, with 44 confirmed hits in the urban area. From the 142 rounds that struck Luxembourg, total casualties were 10 dead and 35 wounded.

Fate
One of the two Lampaden guns was dismantled on 15 February 1945 , and firing ceased on 22 February, when US Army units had advanced to within  of the Lampaden site.

A second battery of guns began to be deployed in January 1945 at Buhl, aimed at Belfort in support of the Operation Nordwind offensive. One gun was erected before the failure of the Nordwind offensive put the site at risk, and the equipment was removed before firing could begin.

There were other proposals to deploy batteries to bombard London, Paris, Antwerp and other cities but these were not implemented due to the poor state of the German railway network and a lack of ammunition. All four HDP guns were eventually abandoned at the Röchling works in Wetzlar and Artillerie Abteilung 705 was re-equipped with conventional artillery. The disassembled gun tubes, spare parts, and remaining ammunition were later captured by the US Army and shipped to the United States where they were tested and evaluated at the Aberdeen Proving Ground, Maryland, and scrapped there in 1948.

Museum
The Mimoyecques museum allows visitors to view the galleries (in various stages of construction and bombing damage), remains of the guns, a small scale V-3 replica, and examples of machinery, rail systems and tools employed. The site also contains memorials to the slave labourers who were forced by the Nazis to construct it and to the airmen killed in action during the destruction of the base.

The Misdroy site also has a museum.

Scale model
Hugh Hunt of Cambridge University, together with explosives engineer Charlie Adcock, created a working scale model of the V-3 gun and was able to prove the ignition of the propellants was done by the advancing gas behind the projectile.

See also

 Cross-Channel guns in the Second World War
 Project Babylon
 Project HARP
 Railgun

References and notes
Notes

Citations

Bibliography

External links

 HDP (Hochdruckpumpe) 

150 mm artillery
Research and development in Nazi Germany
Ruins in France
V-weapon subterranea
V-weapons
World War II artillery of Germany
World War II in the Pas-de-Calais
World War II museums in France
World War II sites in France